Raud is an Estonian surname (meaning "iron"), with notable bearers including:

Eno Raud (1928–1996), children's writer
Ilmar Raud (1913–1941), chess master
Kristjan Raud (1865–1943), painter and draughtsman
Mart Raud (1903–1980), poet, playwright and writer
Mihkel Raud (born 1969), singer, guitarist and journalist
Paul Raud (1865–1930), artist
Piret Raud (born 1971), artist and writer
Rein Raud (born 1961), writer and japanophile, former rector of Tallinn University

See also
 Roud (disambiguation)

Estonian-language surnames
et:Raud (täpsustus)